The 2020/21 FIS Nordic Combined World Cup, organized by the International Ski Federation was the 38th Nordic Combined World Cup season for men, and the 1st season for women. The men's competition started on 27 November 2020 in Ruka, Finland, and concluded on 21 March 2021 in Klingenthal, Germany. The women's inaugural competition started on 18 December 2020 in Ramsau, Austria.

Calendar

Men 

 World Cup history in real time

after GUL event in Klingenthal (21 March 2021)

Women 

 World Cup history in real time

after Gundersen event in Ramsau (18 December 2020)

Men's team 

 World Cup history in real time

after Sprint event in Lahti (23 January 2021)

Men's standings

Overall

Best Jumper Trophy

Best Skier Trophy

Nations Cup

Prize money

Women's standings

Overall

Best Jumper Trophy

Best Skier Trophy

Nations Cup

Prize money

Provisional Rounds

Men

Women

Points distribution 
The table shows the number of points won in the 2020/21 FIS Nordic Combined World Cup for men and women.

Achievements 
First World Cup career victory

Men
  Jens Lurås Oftebro – 20, (4th season) – the WC 3 in Ruka; first podium was 2019–20 WC 1 in Ruka

Women
  Tara Geraghty-Moats – 27, (1st season) – the WC 1 in Ramsau; it also was her first podium

First World Cup podium

Men
  Johannes Lamparter – 19, (3rd season) – no. 2 in the WC 1 in Ruka
  Ryōta Yamamoto – 23, (5th season) – no. 3 in the WC 8 in Lahti

Women
  Tara Geraghty-Moats – 27, (1st season) – no. 1 in the WC 1 in Ramsau
  Gyda Westvold Hansen – 18, (1st season) – no. 2 in the WC 1 in Ramsau
  Anju Nakamura – 20, (1st season) – no. 3 in the WC 1 in Ramsau

Number of wins this season (in brackets are all-time wins)

Men
  Jarl Magnus Riiber, 9 (36) first places
  Vinzenz Geiger, 4 (7) first places
  Akito Watabe, 1 (19) first place
  Jens Lurås Oftebro, 1 (1) first place

Women
  Tara Geraghty-Moats, 1 (1) first place

Retirements 
Following are notable Nordic combined skiers who announced their retirement:

Men
 Bernhard Gruber
 Magnus Krog

Women
  Tara Geraghty-Moats

References 

FIS Nordic Combined World Cup
World cup